The Forbidden City is a 1918 American silent drama film starring Norma Talmadge and Thomas Meighan and directed by Sidney Franklin.  A copy of the film is in the Library of Congress and other film archives.

Plot
The plot centers around an inter-racial romance between a Chinese princess (Talmadge) and an American (Meighan). When palace officials discover she has become pregnant, she is sentenced to death. In the latter part of the film Talmadge plays the now adult daughter of the affair, seeking her father in the Philippines

Cast (in credits order)
Norma Talmadge as San San / Toy
Thomas Meighan as John Worden
E. Alyn Warren as Wong Li
Michael Rayle as Mandarin
L. Rogers Lytton as Chinese Emperor
Reid Hamilton as Lieutenant Philip Halbert
Charles Fang as Yuan-Loo

References

External links

 
 Norma Talmadge Film website
 
 The Forbidden City
 

1918 films
American silent feature films
American black-and-white films
1918 romantic drama films
American romantic drama films
Films about interracial romance
Articles containing video clips
Selznick Pictures films
Films directed by Sidney Franklin
1910s American films
Silent romantic drama films
Silent American drama films